Vladislav Kaborda (born 24 July 1995) is a Belarusian professional footballer.

References

External links 
 
 Profile at FootballFacts.ru
 Profile at lietuvosfutbolas.lt

1995 births
Living people
Belarusian footballers
Belarusian expatriate footballers
Association football defenders
Expatriate footballers in Lithuania
FC Minsk players
FC Smolevichi players
FC Torpedo Minsk players
FC Oshmyany players
FC Baranovichi players
FK Palanga players
FC Smorgon players